The Encyclopedia of Forensic and Legal Medicine 2nd Edition is an encyclopedia of forensics and medico-legal knowledge published by Academic Press, Elsevier in 2016.

References

Encyclopedias of medicine
Encyclopedias of law
English-language encyclopedias